Fritz Gödicke (21 October 1919 – 28 April 2009) was an East German footballer and manager.

In 1951 Gödicke was the shared winner (together with fellow footballer Werner Oberländer) in a poll conducted by the East German sports daily Deutsches Sportecho to determine East Germany's most popular sportsman.

Honours
As player:
 DDR-Oberliga champion: 1950–51

As manager:
 DDR-Oberliga champion: 1956, 1957

References

1919 births
2009 deaths
People from Zeitz
People from the Province of Saxony
Footballers from Saxony-Anhalt
Association football defenders
East German footballers
East German football managers
FC Sachsen Leipzig players
DDR-Oberliga players
FC Erzgebirge Aue managers
East Germany national football team managers
Berliner FC Dynamo managers
1. FC Union Berlin managers